There have been six mayors of Bellingwedde between the establishment of the municipality on 1 September 1968 and its disestablishment on 1 January 2018.

References 

Westerwolde (municipality)
Bellingwedde